Irena Troupová (Irena Troupova-Wilke) is a Czech soprano and early music specialist.

Biography 
Born in České Budějovice, she made her first stage appearances at the Jihočeské divadlo in performances of The Magic Flute and Bastien et Bastienne. During her studies of musicology at the Charles University in Prague she started to focus on early music. She also studied singing at the school with Theresa Blum. Her cooperation with the Musica Antiqua Prague brought a large number of successful recordings.

In recent years she has been most active in Germany, but also performs in other countries, including England, Italy, Denmark, Sweden, France, Switzerland, Poland and others. She performs and records with a number of ensembles including Johann Rosenmüller Ensemble, Schütz - Academy, Capella Sagittariana, Lautten Compagney, Kijivskaja Camera and conductors e.g., Howard Arman, Frieder Bernius, Thomas Hengelbrock,  and Robert Hugo. She regularly performs in the Berlin State Opera, Berlin Symphony Orchestra and others. The most interesting opera productions in which she participated include Monteverdi's L'Orfeo under the leadership of J. Rifkin in Basel, Freiburg and Mulhouse (characters "Musica" and "Proserpina"), the modern premiere (followed by CD production) Opera ' Arminius' H. I. F. Biber in Salzburg, Le Malade Imaginaire by Molière from Marc-Antoine Charpentier and Jean-Baptiste Lully in Berlin and more.

Irena Troupová is a frequent guest at international music festivals such as Tage der Alten Musik Herne, Prague Spring International Music Festival, Festival de musique baroque Caen, Bach-Festival Sumy (Ukraine), the Holland Festival and others. She performs regularly in the Czech Republic, especially with harpsichordist and organist Jaroslav Tůma. Irena Troupová also teaches courses on Early Music in France and the Czech Republic.

Discography 
Schütz: Musikalische Exequien; Schütz, et al.: Trauermusik 
Schütz, Praetorius, Schein, etc.: Funeral Music / Arman 
Monteverdi, C.: Vespers for the Feast of the Ascension (Arman)

References

External links 
 Irena Troupová
 Irena Troupová - Academy of Early Music, Czech Republic 
 Muzikus.cz 
 Discography at Naxos.com
 Discography at hbdirect.com
 Haydnovy hudební slavnosti 
 International Summer School of Early Music Valtice 
 Královský hudební festival 

Living people
Czech expatriates in Germany
Czech operatic sopranos
Musicians from České Budějovice
Year of birth missing (living people)